Rubén Marinelarena Gallego (born November 20, 1979) is an American politician and U.S. Marine combat veteran, having served and deployed as a USMCR Corporal during Operation Iraqi Freedom, who is the U.S. representative for Arizona's 3rd congressional district. A Democrat, he previously served as a member of the Arizona House of Representatives, serving as assistant minority leader from 2012 until he resigned to run for Congress. Gallego was elected to Congress in 2014. His district includes most of southern, western, and downtown Phoenix, along with a portion of Glendale. He served as the national chair of Eric Swalwell's 2020 presidential campaign.

Gallego is a candidate for the United States Senate seat currently held by Democrat-turned-independent Kyrsten Sinema in 2024.

Early life and education
Gallego was born in Chicago, and is a first-generation American, with a Colombian mother and a Mexican father.

Along with his three sisters, he was raised by a single mother. The family eventually moved to Evergreen Park, Illinois, and he graduated from Evergreen Park Community High School.

Gallego attended Harvard, where he became a member of Sigma Chi, and earned a B.A. in international relations.

Career

After college, Gallego joined the Marines. After completing School of Infantry (SOI) training, he deployed to Iraq with Lima Company, 3rd Battalion, 25th Marine Regiment. The 3/25 lost 46 Marines and one Navy Corpsman between January 2005 and January 2006. Gallego's best friend died during combat operations in Iraq.

Gallego's desire to help fellow combat veterans motivated him to get involved in politics. In 2009, he served as the Chief of Staff for District 7 City Phoenix City Councilman Michael Nowakowski before he was elected vice chair of the Arizona Democratic Party. The next year, he was elected to the Arizona State House, representing Arizona District 16.

In 2011, The Arizona Republic named Gallego a distinguished freshman lawmaker. His first successful bill granted in-state tuition status to veterans residing in Arizona. Gallego supports the repeal of Arizona SB 1070. He considers education Arizona's most important long-term priority. In 2012, Gallego was elected assistant minority leader.

Gallego founded the group Citizens for Professional Law Enforcement with the goal of recalling Maricopa County Sheriff Joe Arpaio, citing Arpaio's illegal immigration policies and his use of taxpayer money to investigate Barack Obama's citizenship.

Gallego worked for Strategies 360 as Director of Latino and New Media operations. He also worked for Riester, one of Arizona's largest public relations firms.

U.S. House of Representatives

Elections

On February 27, 2014, Gallego announced his candidacy for Congress in Arizona's 7th congressional district. Although not required to give up his seat under Arizona's resign-to-run laws (since he was in the final year of his state House term), Gallego resigned from the Arizona House in March 2014.

Mayday PAC, a super PAC seeking to reduce the role of money in politics, announced its endorsement of Gallego because of his evolution on the issue of campaign finance reform. On February 28, 2013, Gallego voted against an amendment that sought to raise campaign finance limits for federal candidates and abolish all limits for state candidates, HB 2523. He has since been a vocal supporter of the Government By the People Act.

Gallego won a five-way Democratic primary—the real contest in this heavily Democratic, majority-Latino district—with 48.9% of the vote. He won the general election with 74% of the vote. He has been reelected three times, never dropping below 70% of the vote. He faced only a Green candidate in 2018, and defeated Republican challengers in 2016, 2020 and 2022. Considered a progressive politician, Gallego, who has been very critical of U.S. Senator Kyrsten Sinema, was encouraged by several left-wing organizations to run against her in the 2024 election. He announced his candidacy on January 23, 2023.

Committee assignments
Committee on Armed Services
Subcommittee on Tactical Air and Land Forces
Subcommittee on Intelligence and Special Operations (chair)
Committee on Natural Resources
Subcommittee on Indigenous Peoples of the United States
Subcommittee on National Parks, Forests and Public Lands

Caucus memberships 
 Blue Collar Caucus
 Congressional Arts Caucus
 Congressional Hispanic Caucus
 Congressional LGBT Equality Caucus
 Congressional Progressive Caucus
 House Baltic Caucus
 Medicare for All Caucus

Political positions

Gallego supports the full legalization of marijuana. He supports cap and trade legislation, carbon taxes, and increasing funding for renewable, clean energy.

Gallego opposed the 2022 overturning of Roe v. Wade, describing the decision as "rolling back women's rights".

Gallego opposed the building of the Rosemont mine in Arizona, saying it would have a "devastating" environmental impact. He has sponsored efforts to require operators of public water systems to report when lead is found in water. He supports gun buyback programs. He also supports Obamacare and opposed its attempted repeal. He is an original cosponsor of the Medicare for All Act.

On February 9, 2023, Gallego voted against H.J.Res. 24: Disapproving the action of the District of Columbia Council in approving the Local Resident Voting Rights Amendment Act of 2022 which condemns the District of Columbia’s plan that would allow noncitizens to vote in local elections.

Gallego supported efforts to repeal Don't Ask, Don't Tell. He opposes efforts to deport undocumented immigrants while they wait to be eligible for citizenship. He has co-sponsored efforts to require lawyers for children who are at risk of being deported.

Gallego opposes the privatization of Social Security. He also opposes allowing people to put Social Security taxes in personal retirement accounts. As of October 2021, Gallego had voted in line with Joe Biden's stated position 100% of the time.

Controversies

Corporate-Funded Trip to Qatar 
In July 2021, it was reported that a corporate lobbying group called the U.S.-Qatar Business Council paid for an $84,000 luxury vacation to Qatar for Gallego, fellow Democratic Representative Eric Swalwell, and their wives. Commentators noted the hypocrisy of this trip, as Gallego had previously criticized Senator Kyrsten Sinema for allegedly being too close to business lobbyists.

Remarks About Russian People 
In February 2022, Gallego called for expelling every Russian university student from the United States, prompting commentators to denounce these remarks as bigoted and xenophobic.

Electoral history

2010

2012

2014

2016

2018

2020

2022

U.S. Senate campaign 

On January 22, 2023, Gallego announced his candidacy for the United States Senate in the 2024. The seat is currently held by Kyrsten Sinema, an independent who was first elected as a Democrat in 2018, and who has angered some members of the party due to her opposition to filibuster reform and some Democratic legislation. Sinema has not yet announced whether she is seeking reelection.

Personal life
On August 7, 2008, Gallego changed his name from Ruben Marinelarena to Ruben Marinelarena Gallego to honor his mother, Elisa Gallego, who raised him and his three siblings on her own after his father abandoned the family in his childhood.

In 2010, Gallego married Kate Widland Gallego, who was later elected mayor of Phoenix. They divorced in 2017, just before the birth of their child, Michael. 

Gallego married Sydney Barron in 2021. Barron is a lobbyist for National Association of Realtors.<ref>{{cite news|url=https://www.azcentral.com/story/news/politics/arizona/2021/11/30/5-takeaways-ruben-gallegos-new-book-they-called-us-lucky/8766642002/|title=5 takeaways from Rep. Ruben Gallego's new book 'They Called Us 'Lucky}}</ref> On December 27, 2022, the couple appeared on Good Morning America and announced they were expecting their first child in July 2023.

Gallego sits on the board of Valley Citizens League and the President's Community Advisory Board for South Mountain Community College.

Gallego served in the Marines Third Battalion, Twenty-Fifth Marine Regiment, Lima Company, in the Iraq War. This battalion suffered the most casulties of any battalion. He wrote They Called Us "Lucky": The Life and Afterlife of the Iraq War's Hardest Hit Unit'', published in 2021.

See also
 List of Hispanic and Latino Americans in the United States Congress

References

External links

Representative Ruben Gallego official U.S. House website
Gallego for Arizona campaign website
 

|-

|-

|-

|-

1979 births
Living people
21st-century American politicians
American politicians of Colombian descent
American politicians of Mexican descent
Democratic Party members of the United States House of Representatives from Arizona
Harvard College alumni
Hispanic and Latino American members of the United States Congress
Hispanic and Latino American state legislators in Arizona
Democratic Party members of the Arizona House of Representatives
Military personnel from Arizona
Military personnel from Illinois
People from Evergreen Park, Illinois
Politicians from Phoenix, Arizona
United States Marine Corps personnel of the Iraq War
United States Marines
Candidates in the 2024 United States Senate elections